Marwa Al-Amri (born 8 January 1989) is a Tunisian freestyle wrestler. She was born in Tunis. She represented Tunisia in the women's lightweight freestyle competition at the 2008, 2012, 2016 and 2020 Summer Olympics.  She is the first woman from Africa win an Olympic medal in wrestling.

Career 
At the 2008 Olympics in the 55 kg category, she lost in the first round to Jackeline Rentería.

At the 2012 Olympics in the 55 kg category, she defeated Um Ji-Eun in the qualifications and was eliminated by Sofia Mattsson in the 1/8 finals.

She improved yet again at the 2016 Olympics, in the 58 kg category.  Although she lost to Kaori Icho in the first round, she was entered into the repechage because Icho reached the final.  In the repechage she beat Elif Jale Yeşilırmak, and then Yuliya Ratkevich in her bronze medal match.

In 2020, she won the gold medal in the women's freestyle 62 kg event at the African Wrestling Championships. She qualified at the 2021 African & Oceania Wrestling Olympic Qualification Tournament to represent Tunisia at the 2020 Summer Olympics in Tokyo, Japan. She competed in the women's freestyle 62 kg event.

She won the gold medal in her event at the 2022 African Wrestling Championships held in El Jadida, Morocco. A few months later, she also won the gold medal in the 62 kg event at the 2022 Mediterranean Games held in Oran, Algeria. She competed in the 62 kg event at the 2022 World Wrestling Championships held in Belgrade, Serbia.

Personal life 
She is the oldest of four children.  Her father died when she was nine.  She took up wrestling when she was 11.  Although one of her younger sisters also took up the sport, she quickly quit.

Despite a lack of funding, facilities and female training partners, Amri persevered, attending World and African championships through government funding.

She has a degree in Physical Education.

See also 
 Muslim women in sport

References

External links 
 
 
 

1989 births
Living people
Sportspeople from Tunis
Tunisian female sport wrestlers
Olympic wrestlers of Tunisia
Wrestlers at the 2008 Summer Olympics
Wrestlers at the 2012 Summer Olympics
Wrestlers at the 2016 Summer Olympics
Wrestlers at the 2020 Summer Olympics
Olympic bronze medalists for Tunisia
Olympic medalists in wrestling
Medalists at the 2016 Summer Olympics
Mediterranean Games gold medalists for Tunisia
Mediterranean Games silver medalists for Tunisia
Competitors at the 2009 Mediterranean Games
Competitors at the 2013 Mediterranean Games
Competitors at the 2018 Mediterranean Games
Competitors at the 2022 Mediterranean Games
African Games bronze medalists for Tunisia
African Games medalists in wrestling
Mediterranean Games medalists in wrestling
Competitors at the 2015 African Games
Competitors at the 2019 African Games
World Wrestling Championships medalists
African Wrestling Championships medalists
21st-century Tunisian women